(1913 – 27 February 2009) served as a member of the World Scout Committee, the International Commissioner of the Boy Scouts of Nippon, and as a member of the board of the World Scout Foundation.

Background
Yoshida served in the Imperial Japanese Army as an officer during his youth and was a successful entrepreneur. He was an avid mountaineer and member of the Himalayan Club since 1978.

In 1993, Yoshida was awarded the 230th Bronze Wolf, the only distinction of WOSM, awarded by the World Scout Committee for exceptional services to world Scouting. In 2008 he also received the highest distinction of the Scout Association of Japan, the Golden Pheasant Award. He was then Chairman of the foundation of the Companions of Baden-Powell.

After his death on 27 February 2009, King Carl XVI Gustav of Sweden, President of the World Organization of the Scout Movement, sent flowers to express his condolences to his friend.

References

External links

Full list of Japanese Bronze Wolf recipients
http://www.scout.or.jp/org/officer.html

Recipients of the Bronze Wolf Award
1913 births
2009 deaths
Scouting in Japan
World Scout Committee members